Javan was the fourth son of Noah's son Japheth according to the "Generations of Noah" (Book of Genesis, chapter 10) in the Hebrew Bible. Josephus states the traditional belief that this individual was the ancestor of the Greeks.

Also serving as the Hebrew name for Greece or Greeks in general, יָוָן Yavan or Yāwān has long been considered cognate with the name of the eastern Greeks, the Ionians (Greek Ἴωνες Iōnes, Homeric Greek Ἰάονες Iáones; Mycenaean Greek *Ιαϝονες Iawones). Giving that all Torah scrolls are strictly unpunctuated reading the word יון can give Yon, given as the letter Vaw may just as equally function as consonant (read "v") or vowel (read "o" or "ʊ"). The Greek race has been known by cognate names throughout the Eastern Mediterranean, Near East and beyond: see Sanskrit Yona & Sanskrit ( yavana) or the proto-Aryan languages from which Sanskrit probably originated. In Greek mythology, the eponymous forefather of the Ionians is similarly called Ion, a son of Apollo. The opinion that Javan is synonymous with Greek Ion and thus fathered the Ionians is common to numerous writers of the early modern period including Sir Walter Raleigh, Samuel Bochart, John Mill and Jonathan Edwards, and is still frequently encountered today.

Javan is also found in apocalyptic literature in the Book of Daniel, 8:21-22 and 11:2, in reference to the King of Greece (יון)—most commonly interpreted as a reference to Alexander the Great.

While Javan is generally associated with the ancient Greeks and Greece (cf. Gen. 10:2, Dan. 8:21, Zech. 9:13, etc.), his sons (as listed in Genesis 10) have usually been associated with locations in the Northeastern Mediterranean Sea and Anatolia: Elishah Magna Graecia, Tarshish (Tarsus in Cilicia, but after 1646 often identified with Tartessus in Spain), Kittim (modern Cyprus), and Dodanim (alt. 1 Chron. 1:7 'Rodanim,' the island of Rhodes, west of modern Turkey between Cyprus and the mainland of Greece).

References

External links

Old Testament Genealogy

Book of Genesis people
Hebrew Bible nations
Japheth
Ancient Jewish Greek history
Noach (parashah)
Ionians